Francis Foley may refer to:
 Francis B. Foley, American ferrous metallurgist
 Francis Foley (athlete), English athlete
 Frank Foley, British Secret Intelligence Service officer